Hanging Rock National Natural Landmark is a  site in Wabash County, Indiana that was designated a National Natural Landmark in May, 1986. The site, located on the southern bank of the Wabash River near the town of Lagro, contains an impressive natural exposure of fossilized coral reef dating from the Silurian Period some 400 million years ago.

Hanging Rock is owned by Acres Land Trust, and is open to the public from sunrise to sunset. Camping and littering at Hanging Rock are prohibited.

References

External links

 Acres Land Trust
 Acres Land Trust's Virtual Hike of Hanging Rock on YouTube.
 National Park Service Hanging Rock National Natural Landmark

National Natural Landmarks in Indiana
Protected areas of Wabash County, Indiana
Rock formations of Indiana
Landforms of Wabash County, Indiana